Anja Møller (born 11 May 1978) is a Danish retired midfielder who played for OB Odense and the Danish national team. Since retiring, Moller has become the coach of the Denmark national under-19 football team.

International career

Møller was also part of the Danish team at the 2001 European Championships.

References

External links

1978 births
Danish women's footballers
Denmark women's international footballers
Women's association football managers
Danish football managers
Women's association football midfielders
Odense Q players
Living people